Mahmood Ahmadu (born 9 September 1966), is a Nigerian entrepreneur. He is Founder and Executive chairman of OIS, also known as Online Integrated Solutions Ltd.

Early life and education
Mahmood was born in Nigeria. He obtained his MBA from Nasarawa State University. His further education came in the form of management, IT and communication industry courses, where he utilized these skills to start small businesses that traded products and services.

Career
In the early 1980s, Mahmood got an inheritance from his father, which he used to invest in his very first company known as A2A International Limited. The company made him known amongst the earlier pioneer in the field of trading in GSM in Northern Nigeria. He further leveraged his business over the next several years and expanded his venture both locally and internationally. He has also raised awareness on the importance of education and has also enhanced the quality of education through scholarship programs.

Awards and recognition
Mahmood holds the National Honor of the Officer of the Order of the Niger (OON).

References

Nigerian businesspeople
Living people
1966 births
Nigerian business executives